A gun-brig was a small brig-rigged warship that enjoyed popularity in the Royal Navy during the Napoleonic Wars, during which large numbers were purchased or built. In general these were vessels of under 200 tons burthen, and thus smaller than the more common s or the even larger s. The gun-brigs generally carried 12 guns, comprising two long guns in the chase position and ten carronades on the broadsides.

For brig-rigged sloops, see List of corvette and sloop classes of the Royal Navy. For gunboats, see List of gunboat and gunvessel classes of the Royal Navy.

Development 

The earliest gun-brigs were shallow-draught vessels. Initially they were not brigs at all, but were classed as 'gunvessels' and carried a schooner or brigantine rig. They were re-rigged as brigs about 1796 and re-classed under the new term 'gun-brig'. They were designed as much to row as to sail, and carried their primary armament firing forward - a pair of long 18-pounders or 24-pounders, weapons which in any practical sense could only be trained and fired with the vessel under oars.

The 1797 batch introduced means to improve their sailing ability. Each was fitted with a Schank drop keel, and lighter bow chasers replaced the heavy pair of guns firing forward over the bows; in later vessels one of the bow chasers would be moved aft to become a stern chaser, both of these guns then being mounted on the centreline and able to pivot. The broadside weapons consisted of 18-pounder carronades mounted on slides along both sides.

The later gun-brigs developed from this beginning into smaller versions of the brig-sloops with increased draught and seaworthiness, but were less suited for inshore warfare. Compared with the flat-bottomed hulls of the 1794-1800 designs, by the time of the Confounder class the hulls had achieved a relatively sharp cross-section, as performance under sail had become a more important consideration than ease of rowing. By now they were clearly seen as small versions of the brig-sloop rather than enlarged gunboats.

Deployment 
The early gun-brigs were seen as inshore and coastal vessels, and saw their first service in coastal operations, notably in the Channel, where they sought out French coastal shipping. As their numbers grew and more seaworthy designs emerged, they were deployed worldwide, notably in the Baltic where many were involved in confrontations with the myriad of Danish gunboats during the Gunboat War, but also on such distant stations as the East Indies.

Complement 
The purpose-built gun-brigs were all established with a complement of 50 men, and maintained this level throughout their main period of operation, although the actual number carried varied with availability. The final batch saw the complement raised to 60. Each gun-brig had a lieutenant in command (unlike brig-sloops, which were under commanders), and while he was the only commissioned officer aboard, he was assisted by a midshipman and a number of warrant officers - a master's mate (ranked as 'master and pilot') to share the watches, carpenter's mate, gunner's mate, boatswain's mate and surgeon's mate. Other petty officers included a ropemaker, sailmaker, clerk, quartermaster and quartermaster's mate. There were fifteen marines on board - a sergeant to command, a corporal, and thirteen privates. The rest of the crew were ranked as seamen - able seamen, ordinary seamen or landsmen.

Historical evaluation
The naval historian and novelist C.S. Forester commented in relation to the gun-brigs that:

In this criticism of the gun-brig, Forester was perhaps being a little unfair; the class had been designed largely as convoy escorts for coastal operations and it is little wonder they rolled heavily in the open sea.

List of gun-brig classes and their evolution 

The following sub-sections describe the sequence of the gun-brigs built to individual designs from the earliest acquisitions of 1793 until the last gun-brigs joined the Navy in 1813.

1793 purchases 
Three vessels of about 140 tons each were purchased in 1793, and armed with two 18-pounder long guns and ten 18-pounder carronades. They were numbered (not named) GB No. 1, GB No. 2 and GB No. 3. No further details were recorded, but their existence probably explains why the initial numbering of the Acute class below (prior to their being given names) began with GB No. 4.

Conquest class 

The first batch of twelve gun-brigs were all built by contract to a design by Surveyor of the Navy Sir John Henslow, and ordered on 6 March 1794; they were all named and registered on 26 May. They were designed to be rowed (with 18 oars) as well as sailed, for which purpose they carried a brig rig, though it was originally planned to rig them as schooners or brigantines. The initial plan was that they would mount a main armament of 4-pounder long guns, but this was rapidly substituted by a broadside battery of ten 18-pounder carronades, with two 24-pounders as chase guns in the bow and two 4-pounders as chase guns in the stern. The 4-pounders were soon deleted, making them all 12-gun vessels.

From March 1795 all twelve of the class were attached to the Inshore Squadron commanded by Captain Sir Sidney Smith.

Acute class 

A further design by John Henslow, to which fifteen vessels were ordered on 7 February 1797. In this design, the breadth was increased by a foot from the Conquest class, and the depth of the hold was increased by eleven inches. All were brig-rigged and received Schank sliding or drop keels.

Initially these were intended to be classed as gunboats, and were given numbers (nos. GB No. 4 to GB No. 18) rather than names, but on 7 August they were re-classed as gunbrigs and given names. They carried the same armament as their predecessors.

Courser class 

At the same time as John Henslow was designing the Acute class, his colleague, fellow-Surveyor Sir William Rule, was ordered to produce an alternative design. Rule's design too incorporated a Schank drop or sliding keel.

Fifteen vessels to this design - the Courser class - were ordered at the same time as those to the Acute class. A sixteenth unit was added to the order a month later. Originally numbered GB No. 19 to GB No. 33, plus GB No. 45, the following sixteen vessels were all given names on 7 August 1797.

1797 purchases 

The first ten of these small mercantile brigs were all purchased at Leith and fitted there for naval service, being registered on the Navy List on 5 April 1797. An eleventh vessel (Staunch) was purchased in frame in Kent and registered on 15 April 1797. These assorted vessels did not constitute a single class, but as procured as a group they are here treated similarly. Originally numbered GB No. 34 to GB No. 44, the following eleven vessels were all given names on 7 August 1797.

1799 purchase 

Built in 1798 as a cutter, and re-rigged by the Navy as a brig, this was a very small vessel of only 60 tons, established with just 18 men and six 3-pounder guns. One should perhaps consider this vessel in practice simply as a gunboat, although she was rated as a gun-brig. In 1825 Malay pirates captured her and massacred her entire crew before wrecking her on Babar Island in the southern Moluccas.

Archer class (1801 batch) 

As in 1797, the two Surveyors were asked to produce alternative designs for the next batch of gun-brigs, which were lengthened by five feet from the previous classes. Ten vessels were ordered at the close of 1800 to Sir William Rule's design. One, Charger, received an 8-inch brass mortar in 1809.

Bloodhound class 

Sir John Henslow produced his equivalent design to that of Rule's Archer batch, and ten vessels were ordered to this design just nine days after those of his colleague's design.

1793–1801 ex-French prizes

During the French Revolutionary War, some twenty-one similar vessels were captured from the French (both naval vessels and privateers) and commissioned in the Royal Navy as gun-brigs. These assorted vessels did not constitute a single class, but as all were procured from the enemy during the French Revolutionary War they are here treated similarly.

Actif
Requin
Dixmunde
Nieuport
Ostend
Resolue
Lacedemonian
Athenienne
Venom
Transfer
Deux Amis
Halifax
Fortune
Aventurier

Captured together
Commodore Sir Sidney Smith in  took a flotilla of seven vessels at Acre on 18 March 1799. The British took them into service. 
; 
Foudre;
; 
Marie-Rose

Deux Freres;
Torride.

1801 ex-Spanish prize

1796–1800 ex-Dutch prizes 

During the French Revolutionary War, two similar vessels were captured from the Dutch and commissioned in the Royal Navy as gun-brigs. These vessels did not constitute a single class, but as both were procured from the enemy during the French Revolutionary War they are here treated similarly.

Archer class (1804 batch) 

Most of the early gun-brigs were sold or broken up during the short-lived Peace of Amiens. Consequently, in the first half of 1804, the Admiralty ordered a further batch of forty-seven gun-brigs to the 1800 William Rule design - 25 on 9 January, seven on 22 March and 15 during June - with an additional one ordered from Halifax Dockard, Nova Scotia on 1 October. Many reused the names of gun-brigs that had been disposed of or lost before 1804.

1804 purchases 

These four assorted vessels purchased in June 1804 did not constitute a single class, but as procured as a group they are here treated similarly.

Confounder class 

The Confounder-class vessels were built to an 1804 design by William Rule. The design reflected learning from the experiences of the earlier gunbrig classes. As a result, the Confounder-class vessels were more "sea-kindly" and better able to handle long voyages. Two vessels were converted to mortar brigs in 1809.

1806 purchases 

These two vessels were the former Revenue cutters Speedwell and Ranger respectively. These two assorted vessels did not constitute a single class, but as procured from the same source they are here treated similarly.

Bold (or modified Confounder) class 

A revival of Sir William Rule's Confounder class of 1804, this final group was built to a somewhat modified version of that design, and were commonly referred to as the Bold class. Twelve were ordered in November 1811, and a further batch of six followed in November 1812. Unlike earlier brigs of this size, most were re-rated as brig-sloops at or soon after their completion, and were under commanders (rather than lieutenants), at least until 1815–17, when they reverted to being gun-brigs.

1803–1808 ex-French prizes 

During the early years of the Napoleonic War, some seventeen similar vessels were captured from the French (both naval vessels and privateers) and commissioned in the Royal Navy as gun-brigs. These assorted vessels did not constitute a single class, but as all were procured from the enemy during the Napoleonic War they are here treated similarly.

Caroline

Eclipse

Hirondelle
Morne Fortunee (i)

Hart
Decouverte
Unique
 (i)
 (ii)

Morne Fortunee (ii)

Carlotta (i)
Carlotta (ii)
Caledon

1804–1809 purchased vessels
Enchantress 
 

Rolla − Purchased 1806; sold 1810

 - Purchased 1809; sold 1813.

1805–1806 ex-Spanish prizes 

During the Napoleonic War, two similar vessels were captured from the Spanish and commissioned in the Royal Navy as gun-brigs. These vessels did not constitute a single class, but as both were procured from the enemy during this war they are here treated similarly.

Leocadia

1807 ex-Danish prizes 

During the Napoleonic War, two similar vessels were captured from the Danes and commissioned in the Royal Navy as gun-brigs. These vessels did not constitute a single class, but as both were procured from the enemy during this war they are here treated similarly.

Brev Drageren
Warning

1808–1810 ex-Dutch prize 
Patriot
Jahde
Ems
Mandarin (ex Dutch Madurense)

1813 ex-American prize 

Mohawk (ex USS Viper)

See also
Bibliography of 18th–19th century Royal Naval history

Notes, citations and references

Notes

Citations

References
 

 

Lists of Royal Navy ships by type
Royal Navy
Royal Navy